Halale (Geʽez: ሀላሌ) is a town in Wolayita Zone, of Southern Nations, Nationalities, and Peoples' Region, Ethiopia. The elevation of the town in meter is 1757. The town is n administrative capital of Kindo Didaye woreda of wolaita zone. And Halale Town lies between 6°47'24"N 37°22'52"E.

Demographics 
Halale is one of densely populated areas in Southern Nations Nationalities and Peoples Region. Total estimated population of the town as of 2007 is 1,427 among this figures female population accounts 690 and male population accounts 737.

References 

Wolayita
Cities and towns in Wolayita Zone
Populated places in the Southern Nations, Nationalities, and Peoples' Region